KQLX (890 AM, "890 Ag News") is a radio station licensed to serve Lisbon, North Dakota. It airs an Agricultural News/Talk format.

A sale was finalized in July 2009, for transfer of ownership from Terry Loomis's Sheyenne Valley Broadcasting to Great Plains Integrated of Fargo, North Dakota. Great Plains Integrated was owned by Scott Hennen until he was forced out of the company in 2010.

The station was assigned the KQLX call letters by the Federal Communications Commission on August 16, 1984.

References

External links
KQLX official website

QLX (AM)
News and talk radio stations in the United States
Lisbon, North Dakota
Agriculture in North Dakota
Radio stations established in 1984
QLX
1984 establishments in North Dakota